Dinamo-Raubichi Minsk is an ice hockey team based in Minsk, Belarus. Founded in 2015, they play in the West Conference of the Russian under-20 Junior Hockey League (MHL).

References

Ice hockey teams in Belarus